Hedlund is a surname of Swedish origin. Notable people with the surname include:

Andreas Hedlund, Swedish vocalist, musician and producer
Andy Hedlund, American ice hockey defenseman
Cole Hedlund (born 1995), American football player
Dennis M. Hedlund, American actor, comedian, newscaster and disc jockey
Frederick Hedlund, American track and field athlete
Garrett Hedlund, American actor
Gustav A. Hedlund, American mathematician
Göthe Hedlund  (1918–2003), Swedish speed skater
Gunnar Hedlund, Swedish politician
Guy Hedlund  (1884–1964), American actor of the silent era
Hanna Hedlund, Swedish singer
Henric Hedlund, Swedish retired professional ice hockey player
Irene Hedlund, (born 1947), Danish book illustrator and children's writer
Lars Hedlund, Swedish strongman who competed in three World's Strongest Man contests
Lina Hedlund, Swedish singer and current member of the pop group Alcazar
Lotta Hedlund, African-American singer
Mike Hedlund, American Major League Baseball pitcher
Per-Erik Hedlund  (1897–1975), Swedish cross country skier
Robert L. Hedlund, American politician and member of the Massachusetts Senate
Simon Hedlund (born 1993), Swedish footballer
Stieg Hedlund, American video game designer, artist and writer
Svenne Hedlund Swedish pop singer
Sven Adolf Hedlund  (1821–1900), Swedish newspaper publisher and politician
Viktor Hedlund  (1853–1922), Finnish politician

Swedish-language surnames

de:Hedlund